This a list of episodes for the television series Galis.

Series overview

Episode list

Season 1 (2012)

Season 2 (2012–13)

Season 3 (2013)

Season 4 (2014)

External links 
 Galis episode guide at TheTVDB 

Lists of Israeli drama television series episodes